Sebastian Lewis Shaw (29 May 1905 – 23 December 1994) was an English actor, theatre director, novelist, playwright and poet. During his 65-year career, he appeared in dozens of stage performances and more than 40 film and television productions.

Shaw was born and brought up in Holt, Norfolk, and made his acting debut at age eight at a London theatre. He studied acting at Gresham's School and the Royal Academy of Dramatic Art. Although he worked primarily on the London stage, he made his Broadway debut in 1929, when he played one of the two murderers in Rope's End. He appeared in his first film, Caste, in 1930 and quickly began to create a name for himself in films. He described himself as a "rotten actor" as a youth and said his success was primarily due to his good looks. He claimed to mature as a performer only after returning from service in the Royal Air Force during World War II.

Shaw was particularly known for his performances in productions of Shakespeare plays which were considered daring and ahead of their time. In 1966, he joined the Royal Shakespeare Company, where he remained for a decade and delivered some of his most acclaimed performances. He also wrote several poems and a novel, The Christening, in 1975. In 1983, he appeared in the third installment of the original Star Wars Trilogy, Return of the Jedi, starring as the redeemed Anakin Skywalker, as well as Skywalker's ghost in the original 1983 theatrical release of the film.

Early life
Shaw was one of three children born to Dr. Geoffrey Shaw, the music master at Gresham's School, a Norfolk independent boarding school, where Shaw began his education. His uncle, Martin Shaw, was a composer of church music, and his family's love of music heavily influenced Shaw's career path.

Career

Early career
Shaw made his acting debut at age eight on the London stage as one of the juvenile band in The Cockyolly Bird at the Royal Court Theatre in Chelsea on New Year's Day of 1914. During his time at Gresham's, he also played Petruchio in The Taming of the Shrew, his first of many performances from the works of William Shakespeare; schoolmate W. H. Auden, who would go on to become a highly regarded poet, portrayed Katherina in the play opposite him. After Gresham's, Shaw planned to become a painter and spent two years at the Slade School of Fine Art before switching his interests to acting; regarding the change, his father informed him, "I wondered when you would come to your senses." He earned a scholarship to the Royal Academy of Dramatic Art in Bloomsbury, London. Actor Charles Laughton enrolled in the academy at the same time as Shaw, who later said his first impression of Laughton was "a poor fat boy". Although Shaw and his fellow students initially felt pity for Laughton, they were quickly impressed with his talent.

Shaw appeared in regional theatres in Bristol, Liverpool and Hull. In 1925, he performed in London as the Archangel in The Sign of the Sun, and played first Lewis Dodd and then the Major in separate productions of The Constant Nymph. He received instruction in verse speaking under famed theatre director William Bridges-Adams in the Stratford Festival Company at Stratford-upon-Avon, where he played some of his early Shakespeare roles, including Romeo in Romeo and Juliet, Ferdinand in The Tempest and Prince Hal in Henry IV in 1926. He was criticised for the audacity he displayed in the latter role. When Prince Hal takes on his kingship and rejects the self-indulgent character Falstaff, convention of the day called for Prince Hal to change from a jovial drinking partner to an arrogant snob, but Shaw saw the view as simple-minded and contradictory toward Shakespeare's script. Instead, he displayed inward regrets about leaving Falstaff and accepting the new responsibilities. The interpretation was criticised at the time but, years later, became the standard approach to the character.

Shaw made his Broadway debut in 1929, when he played the murderer Wyndham Brandon in Patrick Hamilton's stage thriller, Rope's End. In 1929, he married Margaret Delamere and lived with her in the Albany, an apartment complex off of Piccadilly in London. The two would eventually have a daughter together named Drusilla (born 1932). He returned to the works of William Shakespeare in 1931, playing Claudio in Measure for Measure at London's Fortune Playhouse. In 1932 he once again played Romeo at the Embassy Theatre. Other works around this period included productions of Ivor Novello's Sunshine Sisters in 1933, Double Door alongside actress Sybil Thorndike in 1934, J.M. Barrie's A Kiss for Cinderella in 1937, and Robert Morley's Goodness, How Sad in 1938.

The first film Shaw appeared in was Caste in 1930. He soon began to make a name for himself in films such as Brewster's Millions in 1935, Men Are Not Gods in 1936 and Farewell Again in 1937. He was making about £300 a week during this stage of his career, a significant sum higher than the salary of the British Prime Minister of the time. He brought what the Daily Telegraph described as a "smooth villainy" to the role of Frank Sutton in The Squeaker in 1937, while in 1939 he played the hero Cdr. David Blacklock alongside Conrad Veidt and Valerie Hobson in The Spy in Black, Michael Powell and Emeric Pressburger's first collaboration. Shaw described himself as a film buff and called Academy Award-winning actor Spencer Tracy his "great god of all screen actors"; he was so impressed by Tracy's technique that he claimed to become depressed while watching his films because Tracy made acting look simple, while Shaw claimed to find it so difficult to master himself.

World War II and post-war career 

When World War II broke out, Shaw took a break from acting and joined the Royal Air Force. He was commissioned as an Acting-Pilot Officer on probation in the Administrative and Special Duties Branch on 25 April 1941 and over the next three months was promoted to Pilot Officer on probation, then Flying Officer and then Flight Lieutenant. According to his obituary in the Guardian, he saw little action in the service and was told the only chance he would have to fly would be as a rear gunner. Some of his fellow airmen hounded Shaw for autographs while others mocked his posh accent, to which he retaliated with an excellent and unflattering imitation of their less refined speech. He continued to hold a Royal Air Force Volunteer Reserve commission after the war until he resigned the commission on 10 February 1954; he was permitted to retain his rank.

Immediately upon returning to London after the war, Shaw lost his Albany flat and his acting contract, and essentially had to restart his acting career. Although he made 20 films before the war and had already begun to develop a reputation as a strong leading man, in later years he would describe himself as "a rotten actor" in the 1930s who landed roles based mainly on his good looks. He used the phrase "a piece of cinema beefcake" to describe himself as an actor during that period. He felt that after his return home from military service, he learned to act properly and began to mature as a performer. Shaw's Royal Air Force experience was put to good use when he played a pilot in Journey Together, the 1946 RAF training film in which actor Edward G. Robinson coached actor Richard Attenborough in the rudiments of flying.

In 1945, Shaw returned to the Embassy Theatre to direct Fyodor Dostoevsky's The Gambler. Significant theatre roles that decade included Hercules in The Thracian Horses at the Lyric Theatre, Hammersmith in 1946, Mr. Hern-Lawrence in Florida Scott-Maxwell's experimental I Said to Myself at the Mercury Theatre, Notting Hill Gate in 1947, Sir James Kirkham in His Excellency at Prince's Theatre in 1950, and Filmer Jesson, MP, in Arthur Wing Pinero's His House in Order at New Theatre in 1951. In 1956, he played the title role in the first British production of Hugo von Hofmannsthal's Everyman. That same year, he wrote the lyrics to his father's ballad-opera, All at Sea, which played at the Royal College of Music. In 1957, he played Lucifer in Brother Lucifer in Shrewsbury, Shropshire, and a sinister Venetian agent in Jonathan Griffin's The Hidden King in Edinburgh.

As Shaw grew older, his reputation as a dramatic actor grew stronger, and he became known for a sharp intelligence and dignified style. Although his good looks diminished, reviewers felt that he used his florid and weatherbeaten face well in evoking grandeur and self-assuredness in such roles as generals, priests and his familiar Shakespearean parts. In 1956, his wife Margaret Delamere died; she was survived by their daughter Drusilla. Shaw began a romantic relationship in the mid-1950s with Joan Ingpen, the well-known classical music and opera talent agent who had previously represented him. The two were romantically involved, to the point that she took his surname, until Shaw's death. During the 1980s, however, Shaw also had a brief relationship with Harriet Ravenscroft, the mother of the disc jockey John Peel, whom he met while performing at Ludlow Castle at Ludlow. He split his time between Ingpen and Ravenscroft on a four-day rotating basis to which both women consented. Although Peel got along with Shaw and said he made his mother happy, he said he did not feel comfortable with the arrangement. He felt it disrupted his mother's friendships and prospects for a more stable relationship.

In 1965, British theatre director William Gaskill was named artistic director of the Royal Court Theatre, where he hoped to re-establish a repertoire. He approached Shaw, who had made his acting début at the Royal Court Theatre as a youth, and Shaw agreed to return. There he delivered several performances over the next year, including General Conrad von Hotzendorf in John Osborne's A Patriot for Me; various roles in Ann Jellicoe's Shelley; Sir Francis Harker in N.F. Simpson's The Cresta Run and Pte Atterclife in John Arden's Serjeant Musgrave's Dance.

Royal Shakespeare Company 

In 1966, Shaw joined the Royal Shakespeare Company, where he spent the next decade of his career and eventually became an associate artist. He mostly appeared in Shakespeare plays, including the title role in Cymbeline, Edmund of Langley in Richard II, the King in All's Well That Ends Well, Ulysses in Troilus and Cressida, and Leonato in Much Ado About Nothing. The Times described his performance in the title role of Cymbeline as "awe-inspiring", and The Independent described his performance as Polonius in Hamlet as "unrivalled in his complacency and sense of circumstance". The Telegraph described his performance of Gloucester in King Lear as "doleful" and his performance of Duncan in Macbeth as "decent". Many of the company's Shakespearean productions at the time were considered interpretive and modern, which drew criticism from some traditionalists, but Shaw defended the experimental nature of the shows and rejected the notion that plays should be restricted to preconceived interpretations.

During his time with the company, he also demonstrated what the Daily Telegraph called a "crusty charm" as Sir Oblong Fitz Oblong in Robert Bolt's children's play The Thwarting of Baron Bolligrew. He was also noted as possessing a gift for dry comedy during this period of his acting career, exemplified by his roles in Maxim Gorky's plays Enemies and Summerfolk. He demonstrated a particular knack for Russian comedy in Jonathan Miller's productions of the Anton Chekhov plays Three Sisters and Ivanov.

In 1978, Shaw earned acclaim for his performance as a judge in the stage debut of Whose Life Is It Anyway? at the Mermaid Theatre. The production won Laurence Olivier Awards for Best Play and Best Actor (Tom Conti). Although 73 years old, Shaw did not let his age slow down his career. During the run of this production a mugger tried to steal his money, but Shaw chased him down, tackled him and recovered his property. Later that year, he was painted in the nude by his nephew, Brian Ocean. During his later years, Shaw suffered a physical disability that made him tremble, which had a negative impact on his television roles, particularly when handling cups or trays of drinks. One of his later television appearances was in The Old Curiosity Shop, a 1979 mini-series based on the novel by Charles Dickens. Around this time, he also voiced the part of Squire Beltham in a radio production of The Adventures of Harry Richmond, which the Daily Telegraph said was "remembered with affection". He lent his voice to several radio performances, both Shakespearean and modern, including protagonist John Tanner in the five-hour Man and Superman by George Bernard Shaw.

Writing career 
Shaw wrote Take a Life, his first play, in 1961. He directed a production of the show at London's Mermaid Theatre, where he also played the lead role of the Detective. That same year he played two lead roles in George Bernard Shaw plays at the Dublin Theatre Festival: Mrs. Warren's Profession and Candida. Around this time, he also wrote an outline for a television comedy series about four girls sharing a flat, inspired by his real-life daughter, who was in her early twenties and living in a flat with other girls her age. The series was submitted to the Granada Television company, which expressed interest in the show and said it was one of two under consideration for television. The company ultimately chose the other show, the long-running British soap opera Coronation Street.

Shaw agreed to take certain roles only on the condition that he have complete freedom to rewrite his dialogue. When he appeared in It Happened Here, a 1966 World War II film, he wrote many of his own lines, which the filmmakers later said "gave his dialogue an individual slant which enhanced his performance". He also helped in other aspects of the filmmaking, including casting; he introduced the filmmakers to Fiona Leland, who would be cast as the wife of Shaw's character in It Happened Here. He wrote other plays, including The Ship's Bell, The Cliff Walk, The Glass Maze and Cul de Sac. He also wrote Poems, a collection of his personal poetry, which saw a limited print of 300 editions by publisher Exeter University.

Shaw wrote The Christening, his only novel, in 1975. It centres around Miles Madgwick, who believes that he is bisexual but is too timid to find out through physical intercourse, so he instead describes his most intimate thoughts in his diary. He then meets a married woman named Alice and her son, Rodney; he comes to identify with Rodney's childhood innocence, and in Alice sees a symbol both of his mother and a heterosexual lover. Alice starts to tire of her husband and grow fonder of Madgwick, who experiences mixed emotions in his continued interactions with her and Rodney. One night, Rodney stays overnight at Madgwick's house and, when he takes the boy home in a taxicab, the driver observes their strange behaviour and accuses Madgwick of being a pederast. When Alice asks Madgwick to become the godfather to her new child, the driver threatens to expose Madgwick, creating a conflict between losing his first feelings of intimacy with others or facing humiliation and ridicule at the driver's exposure.

A description in the book cover flap reads, "In this tender, sensitive and blackly comic novel, Sebastian Shaw, the distinguished Shakespearean actor, explores areas of sexual and emotional encounter that are rarely seen and, unfortunately, too rarely understood." Shaw originally planned to call the novel The Godfather, but later said he was glad he did not due to the popularity of Mario Puzo's book of that name. He was said to have been working on another novel shortly after The Christening was completed, but no others were ever published.

Shaw's memoirs were published posthumously in 2016.

Return of the Jedi 

In 1982, Shaw was chosen for the small but crucial role of redeemed, unmasked and dying Anakin Skywalker in Return of the Jedi, the third and final film in the original Star Wars trilogy. As in the previous films, David Prowse and Bob Anderson played the costumed scenes, while James Earl Jones and Ben Burtt provided the voice and breaths of Darth Vader. Shaw was cast in a single scene with Mark Hamill, during the moment aboard the second Death Star when Luke Skywalker unmasks his dying father. Since the scene was unquestionably the emotional climax of the film, the casting crew sought an experienced actor for the role. Contrary to popular belief, Shaw was familiar with the previous two Star Wars films and enjoyed them particularly for the visual effects, which he described in an interview with science-fiction film magazine Starlog as "brilliant techniques which, in many ways, were revolutionary, something quite new."

When Shaw arrived at the set for filming, he ran into his friend Ian McDiarmid, the actor playing Emperor Palpatine. When McDiarmid asked him what he was doing there, Shaw responded, "I don't know, dear boy, I think it's something to do with science-fiction." His presence during the filming was kept secret from all but the minimum cast and crew, and Shaw was contractually obliged not to discuss any film secrets with anyone, even his family. The unmasking scene, directed by Richard Marquand, was filmed in one day and required only a few takes, with no alteration from the original dialogue. When the film was re-released on DVD in 2004, a few changes were made: the unmasking scene with Hamill remained mostly the same, but Shaw's eyebrows were digitally removed to maintain continuity with the injuries Darth Vader suffers at the end of Revenge of the Sith. Shaw's eyes were also digitally coloured to match Hayden Christensen's, who portrayed Anakin in Attack of the Clones and Revenge of the Sith.

Star Wars creator George Lucas personally directed Shaw for his appearance in the final scene of the film, in which he is a Force ghost of Anakin. Shaw's image in this scene was replaced with that of Christensen in the 2004 release. This last attempt to tie the prequel and original trilogies together proved to be among the most controversial changes in the Star Wars re-releases.

Although Shaw's unmasking scene lasted only two minutes and seven seconds and included just 24 words of dialogue spoken by Shaw, he received more fan mail and autograph requests from Return of the Jedi than he had for any role in the rest of his career. He later reflected that he very much enjoyed his experience filming for Return of the Jedi and expressed particular surprise that an action figure was made of him from the film.

Later career 

Shaw remained active in his later years; along with fellow Royal Shakespeare Company actors Ian Richardson, John Nettles, Martin Best and Ann Firbank, he engaged in discussions and workshops with acting teachers and students in the early 1980s. Although appearances in films became far less common in his later career, he received much acclaim for his performance as the Cold War spy Sharp in Clare Peploe's High Season at the New York Film Festival in 1987; The San Diego Union-Tribune said Shaw played the role with "endearing, sweet gravity". One of his last performances was in the Christmas season of 1988 and 1989, when he played the wizard in a stage production of The Wizard of Oz at the Barbican Centre. The Times said audiences were "delighted to recognise his honeyed threats from behind the great carapace that disguised the Wizard of Oz". Shaw became an honorary life-member at the Garrick Club, which included such past members as writers Charles Dickens, J.M. Barrie, Kingsley Amis and A.A. Milne; artists Dante Gabriel Rossetti and John Everett Millais; and composer Edward Elgar.

Death
Shaw died of natural causes on 23 December 1994 at the age of 89 in Brighton, Sussex, England. A memorial service was held on 15 February 1995 at St Paul's, Covent Garden, commonly known as the Actors' Church due to its long association with the theatre community. Actors Ian Richardson and Ben Kingsley read works by William Shakespeare, stage actress Estelle Kohler read How Do I Love Thee? by Victorian poet Elizabeth Barrett Browning, actress Sheila Allen read Life by Welsh poet George Herbert and actor Kenneth Branagh read from the works of Canon Henry Scott Holland. One of Shaw's own poems, Gemini, was also read by Alan Ravenscroft. Baritone Stephen Varcoe sang  by Johannes Brahms, accompanied by Graham Johnson on the piano, and guitarist Martin Best performed and sang his composition of Ariel's Songs from The Tempest. Shaw was survived by his partner Joan Ingpen, daughter Drusilla MacLeod, sisters Susan Bonner-Morgan and Penelope Harness, and sister-in-law Olga Young.

Filmography

References

External links 
 
 

1905 births
1994 deaths
Alumni of RADA
English male film actors
English male stage actors
English male television actors
English theatre directors
English male poets
English male novelists
English male dramatists and playwrights
People educated at Gresham's School
People from Holt, Norfolk
Royal Air Force Volunteer Reserve personnel of World War II
Royal Shakespeare Company members
20th-century English male actors
20th-century English male writers
Royal Air Force officers